William Miller House may refer to:

 William Miller House (Hodgenville, Kentucky), listed on the National Register of Historic Places in LaRue County, Kentucky
 William Starr Miller House, a mansion in New York City
 William Davis Miller House, Wakefield (South Kingstown), Rhode Island, NRHP-listed
 The William Miller House, a historic home in Richmond, Virginia, within the NRHP-listed Fan District
 William Miller House (Miller Place, New York), an early 18th-century house in Miller Place, New York

See also
 Miller House (disambiguation)